Eagle Rock may refer to:

Entertainment
 "Eagle Rock" (song), a hit single in 1971 by Australian band Daddy Cool
 "Eagle Rock", a song by Motörhead
 Eagle Rock Entertainment, a record label

Places
 Eagle Rock (formation), in California
 Eagle Rock (Idaho), an early name for Idaho Falls, Idaho
 Eagle Rock, Los Angeles, a neighborhood in California
 Eagle Rock, Pacific Crest Trail, Southern California
 Eagle Rock (Santa Monica Mountains), California
 Eagle Rock, Missouri
 Eagle Rock, North Carolina, an unincorporated community in Wake County
 Eagle Rock (Pistol River, Oregon), listed on the NRHP in Curry County, Oregon
 Eagle Rock, Virginia, a town in northern Botetourt County
 Eagle Rock in Hill County, Montana
 Eagle Rock in Mineral County, Montana
 Eagle Rock Reservation, New Jersey, on First Mountain in the Watchung Range

Other
 Alexander Eaglerock, a 1920s and 1930s American biplane